Asemonea pallida is a jumping spider species in the genus Asemonea that lives in Kenya. The female was first described in 2001 by Wanda Wesołowska.

References

Endemic fauna of Kenya
Salticidae
Fauna of Kenya
Spiders of Africa
Spiders described in 2001
Taxa named by Wanda Wesołowska